Duryee or Duryée is a surname. Notable people with the surname include:

Abram Duryée (1815–1890), American Union Army general
Charles Duryee Traphagen (1862–1947), American newspaper publisher
Jacob Eugene Duryée (1839–1918), American Union Army lieutenant colonel

See also
Duryea (surname)